British Mandate may refer to:

 Mandate for Palestine, a 1920 League of Nations mandate for territory formerly held by the Ottoman Empire in Palestine and Transjordan
 Mandatory Palestine, the geopolitical entity controlled by the United Kingdom from 1920 to 1948 under the League of Nations mandate
 British Mandate for Mesopotamia (legal instrument), an unratified 1920 proposal to the League of Nations regarding the government of Iraq

See also
 Mandatory Iraq (Mandatory Mesopotamia), British administration of Iraq from 1920 to 1932, following the 1920 Iraqi Revolt against the proposed British Mandate of Mesopotamia